Charles Jerome Daly (July 20, 1930 – May 9, 2009) was an American basketball head coach. He led the Detroit Pistons to two consecutive National Basketball Association (NBA) championships in 1989 and 1990—during the team's "Bad Boys" era—and the 1992 United States men's Olympic basketball team ("The Dream Team") to the gold medal at the 1992 Summer Olympics.

Daly is a two-time Naismith Memorial Basketball Hall of Fame inductee, being inducted in 1994 for his individual coaching career, and in 2010 was posthumously inducted as the head coach of the "Dream Team". The Chuck Daly Lifetime Achievement Award is named after him.

Early life
Born in Kane, Pennsylvania, to Earl and Geraldine Daly on July 20, 1930, Daly attended Kane Area High School. He matriculated at St. Bonaventure University for one year before transferring to Bloomsburg University of Pennsylvania, where he graduated in 1952. After serving two years in the military, he began his basketball coaching career in 1955 at Punxsutawney Area High School in Punxsutawney, Pennsylvania.

College career
After compiling a 111–70 record in eight seasons at Punxsutawney High School, Daly moved on to the college level in 1963 as an assistant coach under Vic Bubas at Duke University. During his six seasons at Duke, the Blue Devils won the Atlantic Coast Conference championship and advanced to the Final Four, both in 1964 and 1966. Daly then replaced Bob Cousy as head coach at Boston College in 1969. The Eagles recorded an 11–13 record in Daly's first year at the school, and improved to 15–11 in 1971.

Daly became the head coach at the University of Pennsylvania in 1971, succeeding Dick Harter. Penn won 20 or more games and captured the Ivy League title in each of its first four seasons with Daly at the helm. The most successful campaign was his first in 1972, when the Quakers recorded a 25–3 record overall (13–1 in their conference), and advanced to the NCAA East Regional Final, eventually losing to North Carolina. An additional significant success for Daly was in 1979, when all five starters on Pennsylvania's Final Four team had initially been recruited by Daly. His overall record after six seasons at Penn was 125–38 (74–10 within the Ivy League).

NBA and national team career
In 1978, Daly joined the NBA's Philadelphia 76ers as an assistant coach. During the 1981 season, the Cleveland Cavaliers hired him as the third head coach that season, but he was fired with a 9–32 record before the season ended. He then returned to the 76ers as a broadcaster until he was hired in 1983 by the Detroit Pistons. The Pistons, a franchise that had not recorded back-to-back winning seasons since the mid-1950s, made the NBA playoffs each year Daly was head coach (1983–1992), and reached the NBA finals three times, winning two consecutive NBA championships in 1989 and 1990. While serving as the Pistons coach, Daly was also a color commentator for TBS's NBA Playoff coverage.
 
Daly was named head coach of the U.S. Dream Team that won the gold medal at the 1992 Olympics, before moving his NBA career onto the New Jersey Nets for the 1992–93 season. Daly stayed with the Nets for two seasons, before resigning over frustration over the immaturity of some of the players on his team.

Daly again took up a role as color commentator for TNT's NBA coverage during the mid-1990s. Daly rejected an offer to coach the New York Knicks over the summer of 1995 after deciding he was not ready for the NBA coaching grind. He would return to coaching with the Orlando Magic at the beginning of the 1997–98 season. Daly stayed two seasons with the Magic and then retired permanently.

Death
Daly was diagnosed with pancreatic cancer in March 2009 and died on May 9, 2009, at the age of 78. He is buried at Riverside Memorial Park in Tequesta, Florida.

Head coaching record

College

NBA

|-
| style="text-align:left;"|Cleveland
| style="text-align:left;"|
| 41||9||32|||| style="text-align:center;"|(fired)||—||—||—||—
| style="text-align:center;"|—
|-
| style="text-align:left;"|Detroit
| style="text-align:left;"|
| 82||49||33|||| style="text-align:center;"|2nd in Central||5||2||3||
| style="text-align:center;"|Lost in first round
|-
| style="text-align:left;"|Detroit
| style="text-align:left;"|
| 82||46||36|||| style="text-align:center;"|2nd in Central||9||5||4||
| style="text-align:center;"|Lost in Conference Semifinals
|-
| style="text-align:left;"|Detroit
| style="text-align:left;"|
| 82||46||36|||| style="text-align:center;"|3rd in Central||4||1||3||
| style="text-align:center;"|Lost in first round
|-
| style="text-align:left;"|Detroit
| style="text-align:left;"|
| 82||52||30|||| style="text-align:center;"|2nd in Central||15||10||5||
| style="text-align:center;"|Lost in Conference Finals
|-
| style="text-align:left;"|Detroit
| style="text-align:left;"|
| 82||54||28|||| style="text-align:center;"|1st in Central||23||14||9||
| style="text-align:center;"|Lost in NBA Finals
|- style="background:#FDE910;"
| style="text-align:left;"|Detroit
| style="text-align:left;"|
| 82||63||19|||| style="text-align:center;"|1st in Central||17||15||2||
| style="text-align:center;"|Won NBA Championship
|- style="background:#FDE910;"
| style="text-align:left;"|Detroit
| style="text-align:left;"|
| 82||59||23|||| style="text-align:center;"|1st in Central||20||15||5||
| style="text-align:center;"|Won NBA Championship
|-
| style="text-align:left;"|Detroit
| style="text-align:left;"|
| 82||50||32|||| style="text-align:center;"|2nd in Central||15||7||8||
| style="text-align:center;"|Lost in Conference Finals
|-
| style="text-align:left;"|Detroit
| style="text-align:left;"|
| 82||48||34|||| style="text-align:center;"|3rd in Central||5||2||3||
| style="text-align:center;"|Lost in first round
|-
| style="text-align:left;"|New Jersey
| style="text-align:left;"|
| 82||43||39|||| style="text-align:center;"|3rd in Atlantic||5||2||3||
| style="text-align:center;"|Lost in first round
|-
| style="text-align:left;"|New Jersey
| style="text-align:left;"|
| 82||45||37|||| style="text-align:center;"|3rd in Atlantic||4||1||3||
| style="text-align:center;"|Lost in first round
|-
| style="text-align:left;"|Orlando
| style="text-align:left;"|
| 82||41||41|||| style="text-align:center;"|5th in Atlantic||—||—||—||—
| style="text-align:center;"|Missed playoffs
|-
| style="text-align:left;"|Orlando
| style="text-align:left;"|
| 50||33||17|||| style="text-align:center;"|1st in Atlantic||4||1||3||
| style="text-align:center;"|Lost in first round
|- class="sortbottom"
| style="text-align:center;" colspan="2"|Career
| 1,075||638||437|||| ||126||75||51||||

See also

Michigan Sports Hall of Fame
 List of FIBA AmeriCup winning head coaches

References

1930 births
2009 deaths
American men's basketball coaches
American Olympic coaches
Basketball coaches from Pennsylvania
Basketball players from Pennsylvania
Bloomsburg Huskies men's basketball players
Boston College Eagles men's basketball coaches
Deaths from cancer in Florida
Cleveland Cavaliers head coaches
College men's basketball head coaches in the United States
Deaths from pancreatic cancer
Detroit Pistons head coaches
Duke Blue Devils men's basketball coaches
FIBA Hall of Fame inductees
High school basketball coaches in Pennsylvania
Naismith Memorial Basketball Hall of Fame inductees
National Basketball Association broadcasters
National Basketball Association championship-winning head coaches
New Jersey Nets head coaches
Orlando Magic head coaches
Penn Quakers men's basketball coaches
People from Elk County, Pennsylvania
Philadelphia 76ers assistant coaches
St. Bonaventure Bonnies men's basketball players
United States men's national basketball team coaches
American men's basketball players